Bemarivo is a rural municipality in north-western Madagascar. It belongs to the district of Ambatomainty, which is a part of Melaky Region. It has a population of 9,091 inhabitants.

It can be reached by the unpaved National road 8c from Morafenobe to Ambatomainty.

References

Populated places in Melaky